Jay Sweet (born 11 August 1975) is an Australian former professional racing cyclist who won a gold medal at the 1998 Commonwealth Games.

He accepted a road cycling scholarship at the Australian Institute of Sport and in 1997 was a member of the ZVVZ–Giant–AIS team. Between 1998 and 2001, he was a member of BigMat - Auber '93 (France). He won the gold medal in the men's road race at the 1998 Kuala Lumpur Commonwealth Games. Sweet rode in the 1999 Tour de France and did not finish stage 15 due to an ankle injury from an accident during stage 3. He retired in 2003 and moved to New Zealand. Whilst in New Zealand he worked as a commercial fisherman and apprentice builder. In 2012, he returned to Adelaide and in 2015 was working as a stonemason.  In 2015, he rode in the Tour of the Riverland in South Australia and finished 2nd in Stage 1. His son, Max Jay Sweet has also become a young cyclist inspired by his father.

Major results

1994
 1st Stage 9 Commonwealth Bank Classic
1996
 1st  National Criterium Championships
 1st Stages 1 & 10 Tour de Langkawi
 1st Stage 2 Tour de l'Avenir
 1st Stage 7 Bay Cycling Classic
 1st Stages 1 & 10 Commonwealth Bank Classic
 6th Overall Tour of Sweden
1st Stage 1
1997
 1st CoreStates Classic
 1st Stages 1, 8, 9, 10 & 15 Commonwealth Bank Classic
 1st Stages 1 & 6 Tour of Japan
 1st Stage 5 Bay Cycling Classic
1998
 1st  Road race, Commonwealth Games
 1st Stages 3 & 8 Tour of Britain
 1st Stage 3 Tour de l'Avenir
 1st Stage 10 Commonwealth Bank Classic
 7th GP de la Ville de Rennes
 8th Classic Haribo
1999
 5th Overall Tour de Normandie
1st Stage 3
 7th Overall Tour de Picardie
1st Stage 2a
2000
 1st Stage 3 Circuit Franco-Belge
 2nd Tour de Vendée
 5th Overall Tour de Normandie
1st Stage 2
2001
 1st Stages 1 & 2 Tour of Rhodes
 1st Stage 8 Circuito Montañés
 1st Stage 3 Tour de l'Ain
 1st Stage 8 Herald Sun Tour

References

External links 
Jay Sweet - Cycling Archives

1975 births
Living people
Cyclists from Adelaide
Australian male cyclists
Cyclists at the 1998 Commonwealth Games
Commonwealth Games gold medallists for Australia
Australian Institute of Sport cyclists
Commonwealth Games medallists in cycling
Medallists at the 1998 Commonwealth Games